Agasanahalli is a village in the southern state of Karnataka, India. It is located in the Dharwad taluk of Dharwad district in Karnataka.

Demographics 
As of the 2011 Census of India there were 37 households in Agasanahalli and a total population of 168 consisting of 84 males and 84 females. There were 29 children ages 0-6.

See also
 Dharwad
 Districts of Karnataka

References

External links
 http://Dharwad.nic.in/

Villages in Dharwad district